The 1992 Tennessee Volunteers football team represented the University of Tennessee in the 1992 NCAA Division I-A football season. The Volunteers were a member of the Southeastern Conference (SEC), in the Eastern Division and played their home games at Neyland Stadium in Knoxville, Tennessee. They finished the season with a record of nine wins and three (9–3 overall, 5–3 in the SEC) and with a victory over Boston College in the Hall of Fame Bowl. The Volunteers offense scored 347 points while the defense allowed 196 points.

Johnny Majors was to enter his sixteenth season as the Volunteers' head coach for the 1992 season. However, in August, Majors underwent emergency quintuple bypass surgery, and as a result Phillip Fulmer was named interim head coach. After Fulmer led the Vols to a 3–0 start, Majors returned and led Tennessee to a 5–3 finish. By the end of the season, the university bought-out the remainder of Majors' contract, and on November 29, Fulmer was named as the Volunteers' new head coach effective after the Hall of Fame Bowl. However, on December 4, Majors announced he would not coach the team in the bowl game, and as a result Fulmer went on to coach the Volunteers to 38–23 victory over Boston College in his first game as Tennessee's full-time head coach. The school officially credits Majors with a record of five wins and three losses (5–3) and Fulmer with four wins and zero losses (4–0) for the 1992 season.

Schedule

Reference:

Roster

Team players drafted into the NFL

Reference:

References

Tennessee
Tennessee Volunteers football seasons
ReliaQuest Bowl champion seasons
Tennessee Volunteers football